The 1950 Boston College Eagles football team represented Boston College as an independent during the 1950 college football season. The Eagles were led by seventh-year head coach Denny Myers and played their home games at Braves Field in Boston, Massachusetts. Boston College finished winless for the first time since 1902 with a record of 0–9–1. The tie came against Wake Forest. Myers announced his resignation as head coach prior to the season finale against rival Holy Cross. He compiled a record of 35–27–4 while at Boston College.

Schedule

References

Boston College
Boston College Eagles football seasons
College football winless seasons
Boston College Eagles football
1950s in Boston